Joseph Tekwiro Norton (29 August 1949 – 14 August 2020) was a Canadian politician and tribe chief of the Mohawks of Kahnawá:ke.

Biography
Norton was a proprietor of the internet club Absolute Poker. He was on the board of directors of TeKnoWave, Turtle Technologies, and Mohawk Internet Technologies. He was a consultant for the Federal Bridge Corporation. He had previously worked as a structural steel fitter. In 2002, he won the National Aboriginal Achievement Award.

Joe Norton died on 14 August 2020 at the age of 70.

References

1949 births
2020 deaths
Canadian Mohawk people
Mohawks of Kahnawá:ke